Mississippi Highway 21 (MS 21) is a state highway in central Mississippi.

Route description

MS 21 begins in Scott County in Forest at an intersection with MS 35 (Woodland Drive N) in the northern part of town. It heads east as two-lane highway to bypass the town along its northern outskirts for a couple of miles to have an intersection with its former alignment into downtown (Old Highway 21) before leaving Forest and curving northward. The highway winds its way north, then northeast, through mostly farmland for several miles, where it crosses Tuscolameta Creek and becomes concurrent  (overlapped) with MS 492 (Damascus Road) near Golden Memorial State Park, before entering Sebastopol. MS 21/MS 492 pass by some neighborhoods and businesses before weaving its way through downtown, where MS 492 splits at an intersection with MS 487 (Main Street). MS 21 now leaves downtown and crosses into Leake County for a short distance before leaving Sebastopol and crossing into Newton County for a short distance before finally entering Neshoba County (with all this happening in less than a mile).

MS 21 heads northeast for several miles through farmland to pass through Dixon before having an intersection with MS 485 to enter a wooded area as it passes by the Neshoba County Fairgrounds and enters the Mississippi Band of Choctaw Indians Reservation. It passes through a portion of the reservation as it has an intersection with MS 488 before the reservation and entering the Philadelphia city limits. MS 21 passes through a rural portion of town before becoming concurrent with MS 15, with the two heading north as a four-lane divided highway through the Williamsville neighborhood, where they pick up MS 16, before MS 21 and MS 16 split off along MS 19 at a partial interchange. MS 16/MS 19/MS 21 have an intersection with unsigned MS 885 as they pass through a major business district before the splits into a one-way pair between Main Street and Beacon Street to pass through downtown, where MS 21 splits off onto Pecan Street just after passing by the Neshoba County Courhouse. MS 21 passes through neighborhoods as a two-lane as it turns onto Columbus Avenue before leaving Philadelphia and traveling through an even mix of farmland and woodlands for several miles, where it has an intersection with MS 491, and crosses Bogue Chitto, before passing through Coy, where it has an intersection with a county road leading to MS 393 (Road 789, provides access to Nanih Waiya) and enters Kemper County.

MS 21 travels east through farmland, then woodlands, to have an intersection with MS 397 at the Preston community before entering Noxubee County. The highway now passes northeast through rugged, hilly wooded, and remote terrain for several miles to become concurrent with MS 39 and entering Shuqualak.

Major intersections

References

External links

Magnolia Meanderings

021
Transportation in Scott County, Mississippi
Transportation in Neshoba County, Mississippi
Transportation in Kemper County, Mississippi
Transportation in Noxubee County, Mississippi